The Poindimié Islands are a group of seven tiny islets, with a collective area of about 3 ha, lying some 10–12 km off the north-eastern coast of Grande Terre, the principal island of the French Territory of New Caledonia in Melanesia in the south-west Pacific Ocean. They are formed of small banks of sand and dead coral, with little vegetation, and provide nesting sites for seabirds and sea turtles.

Important Bird Area
The group has been recognised as an Important Bird Area (IBA) by BirdLife International because it supports breeding colonies of fairy and roseate terns.

References

 
Important Bird Areas of New Caledonia
Seabird colonies
Uninhabited islands of New Caledonia